William Luke Dean (born 28 September 2000) is an English professional footballer who plays as a midfielder for  club Truro City.

Career
After progressing through the academy, Dean made his first-team debut in November 2017 during Exeter City's EFL Trophy tie against Chelsea U21s, being substituted on for Kane Wilson in the 63rd minute. In April 2018, Dean was offered a professional contract by Exeter for the following season. He spent the entirety of the (curtailed) 2019–20 season on loan at Truro City, joining initially for six months before the deal was extended in January 2020. The White Tigers sat atop the Southern League Premier Division South table when the decision to formally abandon the season due to the COVID-19 pandemic was made in March 2020.

On 12 September 2020, Dean mades his league debut in a 2-2 draw against Salford City at Moor Lane, with his home league debut coming in the following fixture against Port Vale. Later that season, in November, Dean joined Bath City on a one-month loan deal.

Dean was released at the end of the season following the expiration of his contract, with manager Matt Taylor citing the lack of a clear pathway to first team football as the reason behind not offering him a new deal. Following his release, Dean joined Southern League Premier Division South side Truro City ahead of the 2021–22 season, reportedly rejecting offers from clubs higher up the football pyramid.

Career statistics

References

External links
Profile at the Exeter City F.C. website (archived)

Will Dean at Aylesbury United

2000 births
Living people
English footballers
Association football midfielders
Exeter City F.C. players
Truro City F.C. players
Bath City F.C. players